Blue Ridge Community College (BRCC) is a public community college with its main campus in Henderson County, North Carolina. It was founded in 1969. It also has a campus in Flat Rock, North Carolina and a Transylvania County campus in Brevard, North Carolina. It is part of the North Carolina Community College System
.

History
According to its college catalog and student handbook, the college was established in May 1969 as Henderson County Technical Institute. At that time, the citizens of Henderson County approved a bond issue and a special tax levy which provided funds for the construction, operation, and maintenance of a physical plant for the school. The institution began operation on December 1, 1969, with the first course offered on January 8, 1970.  The first full-time curriculum began on September 14, 1970. On October 12, 1970, the school's board of trustees voted to change the school's name to Blue Ridge Technical Institute. On July 9, 1979, they voted to change the name to Blue Ridge Technical College. It current name—Blue Ridge Community College—was approved by the board of trustees on September 14, 1987. The school's athletic program is known as the Bears. 

Today, the college operates on two campuses. The Henderson County campus along College Drive is a 13-building, 128-acre complex two-and-a-half miles southeast of Hendersonville, North Carolina. Its mailing address is 180 West Campus Drive, Flat Rock, NC 28731. The Transylvania County campus, completed in 2008, occupies two large facilities on nine acres off Oak Park Drive in Brevard. The mailing address of this campus is 45 Oak Park Drive, Brevard, NC 28742.  Both campuses offer curriculum and continuing education classes.

Academics
Blue Ridge Community College is accredited by the Commission on Colleges of the Southern Association of Colleges and Schools (SACS) to award the Associate in Arts degree (A.A.), the Associate in Science degree (A.S.), the Associate in Fine Arts degree (A.F.A.), the Associate in General Education degree (A.G.E.), and the Associate in Applied Science degree (A.A.Sc.). The college is an accredited member of the North Carolina Community College System and all its programs have been approved by the North Carolina State Board of Community Colleges. Private support of BRCC comes from the Blue Ridge Community College Educational Foundation, Inc., founded in 1974.

References

External links 

North Carolina Community College System colleges
Educational institutions established in 1969
1969 establishments in North Carolina
Two-year colleges in the United States